Angell Conwell (born August 2, 1983) is an American actress. She is known for her roles as Leslie Michaelson in the CBS daytime soap opera, The Young and the Restless and Lisa Stallworth in the Bounce TV sitcom Family Time. In film, she appeared in Baby Boy (2001) and starred as Veronica on Bigger.

Personal life
Conwell was born in Orangeburg, South Carolina and moved to Columbia, South Carolina at the age of 2. She attended Seven Oaks Elementary School in Columbia where she was the first African-American student body president. She also attended Irmo Middle School in Irmo, South Carolina briefly before relocating to Los Angeles, California. Conwell attended Valley View, Glendale High School where she was a cheerleader and member of the Student Body Association and Drama Club. She then attended Glendale Community College also in Glendale.

Career
In 1994, Conwell moved to Los Angeles to film the TV pilot On Our Own. She later was cast in a recurring role in the CBS sitcom Dave's World, and later has appeared in a number of sitcoms, including Sabrina the Teenage Witch, The Parkers, One on One and Cuts. In 2001, Conwell made her film debut appearing in the  coming-of-age comedy Baby Boy opposite Omar Gooding. She later appeared in films The Wash (2001) and Soul Plane (2004).

In 2010, Conwell was cast as attorney Leslie Michaelson in the CBS daytime soap opera, The Young and the Restless. Conwell first appeared in the role of Leslie Michaelson on December 2, 2010 on a recurring status. Conwell auditioned for the role because her "entire family watches the show", she explained "the character was one that I really wanted to play. When I went to the audition, I just really felt it and I think it came off in the audition. I really enjoy working with the cast. They are such great actors which I don’t think a lot of people realize. The whole experience has been just great". In December 2012, after two years on recurring, Conwell was placed on contract by Bell's successor, Jill Farren Phelps however, was dropped back to recurring in August 2014. Conwell made her last appearance as Leslie on June 22, 2017, but returned in April 2019 in a brief guest appearance to honor Kristoff St. John's and his character.

In 2012, Conwell was cast in a leading role alongside Omar Gooding in the Bounce TV sitcom Family Time. In 2019, she began starring in the BET+ comedy-drama series, Bigger''. Angell was honored with receiving the Key to the City of Columbia, South Carolina; her hometown by the Mayor Steven Benjamin on February 5, 2019. A day which the Mayor also deemed as Angell Conwell Day.

Filmography

Film/Movie

Television

Awards and nominations

In 2019, Conwell was given the Key to the City of Columbia, South Carolina by Mayor Steven Benjamin.

References

External links
Home page

1983 births
African-American actresses
American film actresses
American television actresses
Living people
People from Orangeburg, South Carolina
Actresses from South Carolina
American soap opera actresses
21st-century African-American people
21st-century African-American women
20th-century African-American people
20th-century African-American women